Günter Rimkus (22 December 1928 – 29 September 2015) was a German dramaturge and, from 1984 to 1991, manager of the Staatsoper Unter den Linden.

Life 
Born in Stallupönen, East Prussia, Rimkus studied vocal music at the Hochschule für Musik Franz Liszt, Weimar from 1947 to 1953. After graduating, he obtained the position of dramaturge at the Deutsche Staatsoper Berlin. In 1970, he was appointed deputy artistic director there and succeeded Hans Pischner as director of the house from 1984 to 1991. Throughout his tenure at both the Admiralspalast and Unter den Linden, he had a significant influence on its high artistic reputation. For example, he was instrumental in organising the restructuring of the opera and ballet ensembles, as well as the chorus and the Staatskapelle, after the building of the Berlin Wall in 1961, thus ensuring the theatre's ability to perform. The Berlin Hochschule für Musik "Hanns Eisler" appointed him professor of opera dramaturgy.

During his tenure, he particularly promoted young talent and thus significantly rejuvenated the ensemble. He brought today's world stars such as René Pape and Roman Trekel directly from the universities into the ensemble. His repertoire policy continued the traditional promotion of contemporary works. Thus, among others, Büchner by Friedrich Schenker, Gastmahl by Georg Katzer and Graf Mirabeau by Siegfried Matthus were premiered. First performances included Shostakovich's The Tale of the Priest and of His Workman Balda, Schoenberg's Moses and Aron and Victor Ullmann's Der Kaiser von Atlantis. He also successfully expanded the repertoire with rarely performed works such as Verdi's I vespri siciliani, Weber's Euryanthe, Goethe/Reichardt's Erwin und Elmire, Meyerbeer's l'Africaine and Hindemith's Neues vom Tage. During the reconstruction of the Lindenoper in the mid-1980s, he strongly advocated the re-installation of the gable inscription FRIDERICUS REX APOLLINI ET MUSIS, which had been replaced by DEUTSCHE STAATSOPER during the reconstruction in 1955, which had led to Erich Kleiber's breach of contract with the Lindenoper at the time.

As a freelancer for radio, television and records, he rendered outstanding services to the popularisation of classical and modern music. As a publicist, he contributed to both domestic and foreign music journals. Under his directorship, the number of guest tours through Europe and to the Far East increased considerably.

Rimkus was married to prima ballerina  and father of a daughter. Rimkus died on 29 September 2015 at the age of 86.

Awards 
 1973 Order of the Banner of Labor
 1979 Patriotic Order of Merit in Bronze and 1988 in Silver

References

Further reading 

 Günther Buch: Namen und Daten wichtiger Personen der DDR. 4th, revised and expanded edition. Dietz, Berlin (West)/Bonn 1987, .
 Georg Quander (ed.): Appollini et musis. 250 Jahre Opernhaus Unter den Linden. Propyläen, Berlin 1992, .
 Michael Kraus (ed.): Die musikalische Moderne an den Staatsopern von Berlin und Wien 1945–1989. J.B. Metzler Verlag, Stuttgart 2017, .
 Misha Aster: Staatsoper. Die bewegte Geschichte der Berliner Lindenoper im 20. Jahrhundert. Siedler Verlag, München 2017, .

External links 
 Grabstätte von Günter Rimkus bei www.knerger.de (retrieved 1 March 2021).
 

Dramaturges
Opera managers
German opinion journalists
Academic staff of the Hochschule für Musik Hanns Eisler Berlin
Recipients of the Banner of Labor
Recipients of the Patriotic Order of Merit in silver
Socialist Unity Party of Germany members
1928 births
2015 deaths
People from East Prussia